The Lion of Venice (German:Der Löwe von Venedig) is a 1924 German silent film directed by Paul L. Stein and starring Olaf Fjord, Grete Reinwald and Hanni Weisse.

The film's art direction was by Willy Reiber. It was made at the Emelka Studios in Munich.

Cast
 Olaf Fjord 
 Grete Reinwald 
 Hanni Weisse
 Paul Biensfeldt
 Wilhelm Diegelmann 
 Fritz Greiner

References

External links

1924 films
Films of the Weimar Republic
Films directed by Paul L. Stein
German silent feature films
German black-and-white films
Bavaria Film films
Films shot at Bavaria Studios